Nyandeni Local Municipality is a local municipality in the OR Tambo District, situated in the Eastern Cape of South Africa.  Its administrative seat is the town of Libode.  The entire municipal area falls within the former Transkei homeland area.

The urban population is mainly located in the two small towns of Libode and Ngqeleni.

Scattered, low-density rural settlements dominate the municipality.  79% of households reside in traditional or village type settlements.  These settlements are loosely scattered throughout the entire municipal area and are surrounded by communal grazing and arable lands. The majority of residential structures are self-built. Apart from a few trading stores, there is little sign of any significant economic activity within the rural settlements.

Many of the families in the rural regions of the municipality were formerly supported by men who worked as migrant labour in local mines. Subsequent retrenchment at the mines has left these communities with scant means to survive.

About 77% of households can be regarded as indigents with access to either no income or incomes of less than R800 (US $108) per month.

Most of the education institutions in Nyandeni cater to lower level schooling.  Of the 426 schools in the Nyandeni area, 64% are overcrowded or highly overcrowded, according to the OR Tambo District office.

The spread of HIV/AIDS is an extremely severe and urgent problem in the area.  In 2009 the HIV/AIDS prevalence rate was as high as 50%-60% among tested cases; these cases were mainly females who participated in voluntary testing during their regular pregnancy visits to local clinics.

Main places
The 2001 census divided the municipality into the following main places:

Politics 

The municipal council consists of sixty-four members elected by mixed-member proportional representation. Thirty-two councillors are elected by first-past-the-post voting in thirty-two wards, while the remaining thirty-two are chosen from party lists so that the total number of party representatives is proportional to the number of votes received. In the election of 1 November 2021 the African National Congress (ANC) won a majority of fifty-one seats on the council.
The following table shows the results of the election.

References

External links
 Official website

Local municipalities of the OR Tambo District Municipality